The  2006 Beijing Guoan F.C. season  was their 3rd consecutive season in the Chinese Super League, established in the 2004, and 16th consecutive season in the top flight of Chinese football. They competed in the Chinese Super League and FA Cup.

First team
As of May 11, 2006

Competitions

Chinese Super League

Matches

Chinese FA Cup

References

Beijing Guoan F.C. seasons
Chinese football clubs 2006 season